John Gardner Coolidge (July 4, 1863 – February 28, 1936) was an American collector, diplomat, author, and nephew of Isabella Stewart Gardner.

Early life
Coolidge was born in Boston, Massachusetts on July 4, 1863.  He was the second of five sons born to Harvard University Law School graduate Joseph Randolph Coolidge and Julia (née Gardner) Coolidge, both from prominent and wealthy Boston Brahmin families.  His siblings included professor and diplomat Archibald Cary Coolidge, noted lawyer Harold Jefferson Coolidge Sr. (the father of zoologist Harold Jefferson Coolidge Jr.), architect J. Randolph Coolidge Jr. and mathematician and professor Julian Lowell Coolidge.

His paternal uncle was Thomas Jefferson Coolidge, the Boston businessman and U.S. Minister to France.  His father, Joseph Randolph Coolidge, was a great-grandson of the 3rd United States President Thomas Jefferson, through his maternal greatgrandparents, Thomas Mann Randolph Jr. and Martha Jefferson Randolph.  John's great-uncles were Thomas Jefferson Randolph, George Wythe Randolph, and his grandfather, Joseph Coolidge, was a distant relative of President Calvin Coolidge.

Through his mother, John was the nephew of John Lowell Gardner II and his wife Isabella Stewart Gardner.  His mother and uncle John were the grandchildren of merchant Joseph Peabody, one of the wealthiest men in the United States at the time of his death in 1844.

Career
In 1884, Coolidge, like all of his brothers, graduated from Harvard University.  In 1887, he traveled to east for a total of three years, living in Japan and traveling to China, India, Thailand and Malaysia.  From 1890 to 1894, he lived in Brazil where he was a first hand witness to a period of vast political developments and a six-month fight between the Brazilian Army and Navy in the Bay of Rio.

From 1902 to 1906, he was a member of the Peking legation.

Coolidge was appointed Minister to Nicaragua in 1908, at a time the relationship between the United States and Nicaragua was poor, and he arrived in Managua in August. He resigned in anger when no apology was forthcoming after a demonstration, ostensibly celebrating Taft's victory in the election, was disbanded and a U.S. flag confiscated in the process, despite an effort on the part of the State Department to calm him down.

Personal life
On April 29, 1909, Coolidge was married to Helen Granger Stevens (1876–1962), a family friend and the daughter of Henry James Stevens and Helen Meade Granger. Their summer home, Ashdale Farm, in North Andover, Massachusetts, now known as The Stevens-Coolidge Place, is a nonprofit museum today.  The couple hired architect Joseph Everett Chandler to remodel the estate's homes.

Coolidge died on February 28, 1936, in Boston, Massachusetts and was buried at Mount Auburn Cemetery in Cambridge, Massachusetts.

Works

References

External links
 
 

1863 births
1936 deaths
American male writers
American collectors
Ambassadors of the United States to Nicaragua
Massachusetts Republicans
Harvard College alumni